20th meridian may refer to:

20th meridian east, a line of longitude east of the Greenwich Meridian
20th meridian west, a line of longitude west of the Greenwich Meridian